Kalymnos is a Greek island and municipality in the southeastern Aegean Sea. It belongs to the Dodecanese island chain, between the islands of Kos (south, at a distance of ) and Leros (north, at a distance of less than ): the latter is linked to it through a series of islets. Kalymnos lies between two and five hours away by sea from Rhodes.

In 2011 the island had a population of 16,001, making it the third most populous island of the Dodecanese, after Kos and Rhodes. It is known in Greece for the affluence of much of its population, and also stands as both the wealthiest member of the Dodecanese and one of the wealthiest Greek islands overall.

Naming
The island is known as Càlino in Italian and Kilimli or Kelemez in Turkish.

Geography

Moreover, on the north side there is a peninsula which stretches in a northwest direction.

Kalymnos is mostly mountainous with complicated topography. There are three main chains going from W-NW to E-SE, and a fourth which extends NW the length of the peninsula. The coastline is very irregular, with many sheltered coves. There are some springs, one among them being thermal. The soil is mainly limestone-based, but in the valleys, there is a compact bank of volcanic tuff, the relic of an ancient volcano, located in Vigles, between the villages of Myrties and Kantouni. The island is mainly barren, except for the two fertile valleys of Vathys and Pothia, where olives, oranges and vines are grown. There is also an ostrich farm in Argos, near the airport.

Earthquakes are a frequent occurrence around Kalymnos, a fact that is connected with the volcanoes in surrounding islands. The last earthquake that occurred was the 2017 Aegean Sea earthquake with a magnitude of 6.7Mw, which injured two people in Kalymnos.

Archipelago of Kalymnos
Kalymnos is neighboured by the small island of Telendos, which was once part of Kalymnos, but split off after a major earthquake in 554 and is now separated from Kalymnos by a channel of water (about 800 m wide).

History

Inhabited originally by Carians, in Antiquity Kalymnos depended on Kos, and followed its history. The island's Hellenistic Temple of Apollo was excavated by the British archaeologist Charles Newton in the nineteenth century; many of the finds he made, including important epigraphic inscriptions, are in the British Museum's collection. In the Middle Ages it was under the influence of the Byzantine Empire, and during the 13th century it was used by the Venetian Republic as a naval base. In 1310 it came under the control of the Knights of Rhodes, and later (mainly in 1457 and 1460) was often attacked by the Ottomans, who eventually conquered it in 1522. Unlike Rhodes and Kos, during the Ottoman period, there was no Turkish immigration to Kalymnos.

According to the Ottoman General Census of 1881/82-1893, the kaza of Kalymnos had a total population of 9,716, consisting of 9,482 Greeks, 64 Muslims and 170 foreign citizens.

On May 12, 1912, during the Italo-Turkish War, Kalymnos was occupied by Italian sailors of the Regia Marina. Italy took control of the island along with other islands of the Dodecanese (except Kastellorizo initially) until 1947, when the Dodecanese were finally united with mainland Greece, as part of the modern Greek state.

Religion
The majority of Kalymnians are Orthodox Christians. The island belongs to that small part of Greece that does not depend on the Church of Greece, but rather on the Ecumenical Patriarchate of Constantinople based in Istanbul, Turkey. Kalymnos belongs to the Metropolis of Leros, Kalymnos and Astypalaia.

Sponge diving

Kalymnos is known and billed as the "Sponge-divers' island". Sponge diving has long been a common occupation on Kalymnos and sponges were the main source of income of Kalymnians, bringing wealth to the island and making it famous throughout the Mediterranean. The Kalymnians harvested sponges from the sea-bed as close as Pserimos or as far as North Africa. Early diving was done without equipment (free diving), using a harpoon. Sponges are still fished individually, by hand.

The Greek sponge trade was centered close in the Dodecanese, featuring Kalymnos until the mid-80s, when a disease hit the eastern Mediterranean destroying a great number of sponges and damaging the sponge-fishing industry as a result. Today, Kalymnos faces a lack of sponges due to the outbreak of a disease that has decimated sponge crops.

An annual celebration, Sponge Week, occurs a week after Easter to honour this "Kalymnian gold.” Much has been written, sung and filmed about the legendary courage and recklessness of the sponge divers themselves.

The local folk dance Mihanikos depicts the crippling effects of decompression sickness that is caused by sponge diving. It is typically only performed by men.

Climbing 
Kalymnos is a popular rock climbing location with more than 3000 climbing routes set in the limestone rock of the island and a climate that allows climbing all year around. The island has seen a boom in climbing related tourism since 1997, when the Italian Andrea di Bari started establishing the first routes.

Economy
Being mostly barren (only 18% of the land can be cultivated), agriculture has always played a minor role in the economy of the island, except for the valley of Vathi. The island is famous for its citrus fruits grown in this area.

Another industrial activity typical of Kalymnos was the production of painted head scarfs, which were the most original component of the female dress.

In recent times, tourism has become important for the island, particularly for rock climbing. In 2006, the island also acquired an airport, the Kalymnos Island National Airport in Argos, a village between Pothia and Brosta (the villages which are opposite of Telendos), to better link the island with the mainland.

Since the beginning of the 20th century, there has been much emigration from Kalymnos (the 1925 population was some 24,000 inhabitants as compared to 16,500 in 2012), especially to the United States and Australia. The cities of Darwin and Melbourne in Australia, and Tarpon Springs, Gary, IN, and Campbell, OH in the United States are home to large Greek communities of Kalymnian descent.

Kalymnian emigrants and their descendants also form a substantial portion of the bridge painting industry in the USA. Some researchers link this to the sponge diving tradition and way of life as both trades involve dangerous work with long periods away from home.

Notable people 
St Savvas the New of Kalymnos (1862-1947), Orthodox Christian Saint and patron Saint of the island of Kalymnos
Skevos Zervos (1875–1966), professor and surgeon
Bob Costas (1952- ), American sportscaster of Kalymnian descent
Mike Bilirakis (1930 - ), American politician of Kalymnian descent
Gus Bilirakis (1963- ), American politician of Kalymnian descent

Gallery

References

 
Islands of Greece
Dodecanese
Volcanoes of Greece
Municipalities of the South Aegean
Populated places in Kalymnos (regional unit)
Landforms of Kalymnos (regional unit)
Islands of the South Aegean
Members of the Delian League
Climbing areas of Greece